Raphitoma ferroviae is an extinct species of sea snail, a marine gastropod mollusc in the family Raphitomidae.

Description
The length of the shell reaches .

Distribution
Fossils of this extinct marine species were found in Eocene strata in Aquitaine, France

References

 Cossmann, M., and G. O’Gorman. "Le gisement cuisien de Gan (Basses-Pyrénées)." Cossmann, Pau (1923).

External links
 MNHN Paris: Turricula (Crenaturricula) dentata ferroviae

ferroviae
Gastropods described in 1923